The IZh-35 (ИЖ-35) is a Soviet-designed target pistol for competitive shooting sports (including the Olympic games).

History 
The IZh-34 and IZh-35 were designed from 1973–1978. In 1976, state tests of the first prototypes were conducted.

In 1979, IZh-34 and IZh-35 replaced previous Soviet standard sport pistols (ИЖ-ХР-30 and ИЖ-ХР-31).

In 1986 the IZh-35M was designed and began serial production in 1987.

In September 2008, all Izhevsk Mechanical Plant firearms were renamed and IZh-35M got the name MP-35M (Mechanical Plant-35M).

Design 
The IZh-35 is a simple blowback design constructed out of steel. The barrel is fixed to the frame.

It has detachable single column box magazine, which is inserted in the grip.

Variants 
 IZh-34 (ИЖ-34) - first model, 1.2 kg, .22 Short. In 1990, production was discontinued
 IZh-35 (ИЖ-35) - second model, 1.34 kg, .22 LR, serial production began in 1978
 IZh-35M (ИЖ-35M) - third model, 1.2 kg, .22 LR.
 Walther KSP 200 - IZh-35 with new pistol grip made by Carl Walther GmbH in 1998-2000

Users 

  - IZh-35M is allowed as civilian training pistol
  - IZh-35M is allowed as training pistol
  - IZh-35M is allowed as training pistol
  - As of November 2015, almost 95% of all sport shooters in the Russian Federation used IZh-35, IZh-35M or MP-35M target pistols.
 
  - the import was allowed

References

Sources 
 IŽ 34M // «Střelecká revue», 5, 2017 
 Спортивный стандартный самозарядный пистолет MP-35M

.22 LR pistols
Semi-automatic pistols of the Soviet Union
Izhevsk Mechanical Plant products
Weapons and ammunition introduced in 1978